Season 1881–82 was the seventh season in which Heart of Midlothian competed at a Scottish national level, entering the Scottish Cup for the seventh time.

Overview 
Hearts were knocked out in the first round of the Scottish Cup by St Bernard's.

Later in the season they reached the second round of the Edinburgh FA Cup being beaten by rival Hibs.

Results

Scottish Cup

Edinburgh FA Cup

See also
List of Heart of Midlothian F.C. seasons

References 

 Statistical Record 81-82

External links 
 Official Club website

Heart of Midlothian F.C. seasons
Heart